Prosveta can refer to:

Prosveta Publishing House, of the Bulgarian state
Prosveta (Enlightenment), a newspaper published by the Slovene National Benefit Society
 Prosveta (newspaper), a Slovene newspaper published in the U.S. during WWII

See also
 Prosvjeta